Yılmaz Şen (born 1943 in İstanbul – 14 July 1992 in İstanbul) was a Turkish footballer who played as a defender for Fenerbahçe. He was famous as Gilette by his strong ability. He started his career with İstanbulspor where he played between 1962 and 1965 and then transferred to Fenerbahçe. He played there for ten years between 1965 and 1976. He played 18 matches for the Turkey national team.

References

External links
 

1943 births
1992 deaths
Association football defenders
Turkish footballers
Turkey international footballers
Turkey under-21 international footballers
Fenerbahçe S.K. footballers